The 1934 North Carolina Tar Heels football team represented the University of North Carolina at Chapel Hill during the 1934 college football season. The Tar Heels were led by first-year head coach Carl Snavely and played their home games at Kenan Memorial Stadium. They competed as a member of the Southern Conference, finishing with an undefeated conference record of 2–0–1. North Carolina claims a conference championship for 1934, although the official conference champion is Washington and Lee, who finished 4–0–0.

Team captain and guard George T. Barclay became North Carolina's first first-team All-American, being selected by several selectors including the AP and the All-American Board. He later was the head coach at UNC from 1953 to 1955.

Schedule

References

North Carolina
North Carolina Tar Heels football seasons
North Carolina Tar Heels football